Nina Assimakopoulos is a flutist from United States, recording artist, and professor. She is the Assistant Professor of Flute at West Virginia University.

Discography 
Nina Assimakopoulos has recorded five albums of flute music.

References

External links 
 Nina Assimakopoulos's official website

Year of birth missing (living people)
American flautists
West Virginia University faculty
Bowling Green State University faculty
Living people
Women flautists
21st-century American musicians
21st-century American women musicians
21st-century classical musicians
American women academics
21st-century flautists